(died September 7, 2011) was a Japanese anime director. His death was announced by screenwriter Nobuyuki Isshiki via Twitter. Isshiki had previously worked with Yokota on Uchūsen Sagittarius.

Work
Osomatsu-kun (episode director, 1966)
Samurai Giants (assistant episode director, 1973)
Heidi, Girl of the Alps (storyboards, 1974)
Dog of Flanders (storyboards and assistant director, 1975)
3000 Leagues in Search of Mother (assistant director, 1976)
Monarch: The Big Bear of Tallac (storyboards, 1977)
Rascal the Raccoon (assistant director, 1977)
Haikara-san ga Tōru (director and episode director, 1978)
Anne of Green Gables (storyboards, 1979)
The Adventures of Tom Sawyer (storyboards, 1980)
Jarinko Chie (episode director, 1981)
Swiss Family Robinson (storyboards, 1981)
Manga Aesop Monogatari (storyboards, 1983)
Manga Nihonshi (storyboards, 1983)
Mīmu Iro Iro Yume no Tabi (director, 1983)
Uchūsen Sagittarius (director, storyboards, 1986)
Grimm's Fairy Tale Classics (storyboards, animation director, 1987)
Dagon in the Lands of Weeds (director, 1988)
Osomatsu-kun 2 (storyboards and unit director, 1988)
My Daddy Long Legs (director, 1990)
The Mischievous Twins (storyboards, 1991)
Jeanie with the Light Brown Hair (storyboards, 1992)
Yamato Takeru (episode director, 1994)
Devil Lady (storyboard, 1998)
Super Doll Licca-chan (episode director, 1999)
Cosmo Warrior Zero (director and storyboard, 2001)
Sonic X (storyboards and episode director, 2003)
Zoids Fuzors (episode director, 2003)
Peach Girl (episode director, 2005)
To Heart 2 (storyboard, unit director, 2005)
Happiness! (episode director, 2006)

References

Year of birth missing
2011 deaths
Anime directors
Japanese storyboard artists